78th Army Division()(2nd Formation) was formed in late 1969 and designated in December.

The division was a part of 26th Army Corps. During its existence the division was composed of:
232nd Infantry Regiment;
233rd Infantry Regiment;
234th Infantry Regiment;
Artillery Regiment.

In 1985 the division was inactivated and converted to Artillery Brigade, 26th Army.

References
中国人民解放军各步兵师沿革，http://blog.sina.com.cn/s/blog_a3f74a990101cp1q.html

Infantry divisions of the People's Liberation Army
Military units and formations established in 1969
Military units and formations disestablished in 1985